Kambhoji or Kambodhi  is a popular Raga  in Carnatic Music. It is classified as a derived raga from 28th Melakartha, Harikambhoji, and has existed since the 7th century.

Scale
The scale of Kambhoji is 

Arohana: S R2 G3 M1 P D2 S 
 
Avarohana: S N2 D2 P M1 G3 R2 S (N3 P D2 S) 

Usage of "n3" in phrase "npds" makes Kambhoji a bhashanga raga (a raga that includes notes other than what is in the parent raga).

It is a Shadava(6 notes in Arohana) Sampoorna(all 7 notes in Avarohana) raga.

Medieval era
There are numerous references to Raga or Ragini called Kambhoji in ancient Indian musical traditions. Narada's Sangita Makaranda (7th to 8th century AD) broadly classifies Ragas into eight subsets and includes three raginis  in each subset. In this scheme of classification, Narada accepts raga Kambhoji as a mode of Shri raga, the first subset of his scheme of classification.  Ramaditya, the author of  Swara-Mela Kalanidhi  (1550 AD) has accepted 20 melas and has accommodated 64 Jana-ragas among the melas. In this scheme of classification, the twentieth mela is Kambhoji under which come the Jana-ragas like Kambhoji. Ragamala of Pundrikavitthala classifies ragas into six divisions with each group having  several raginis and ragas imagined to be their spouses and sons.  Thus the ragini Kambhoji is assumed to be one among the  several spouses of raga  Nat-Narayana.  Chatravarishach.chhat-Raga Nirupanam authored by Narada (1525-50 AD) lists ten main ragas and accepts the Kambhoji as the spouse of seventh raga called  Raga Nata-Narayana.  Chaturdandi Prakashika  authored by Venkatamakhin (also known as Venkateshwara Dikshit,  ~1660 AD)  assumes 19 melas and  lists the Kambhoji, Kedaragaula and Narayanagaula  as the Janya  ragas under  mela Kambhoji.  The Anupa-Sangit-Ratanakar  by  Sangit Acharya Bhava-Bhata lists 20 ragas as being fundamental ragas.  The third  raga of his scheme, called Kedar Raga, includes  more than a dozen of raginis----the seventh being  the well known Kambhoji.  Raja Tulaji, the ruler of Tanjore (1763-87 AD)  has written a well known book on musicology known as Sangit-Saramritoddhar.  Raja Tulaji assumes 21 Janakmelas and includes Kambhoji and Yadukul-Kambhoji as the Jana ragas under the eighth Janaka-mela of  his scheme of classification.

Matanga’s ancient reference to raga Kambhoji
Most of the references above are comparatively recent but this should not be taken to mean that raga Kambhoji is also of recent origin. Reference to this raga as Thakkesi is in the ancient Tamil epic Cilappatikaram which is referred by the Sanskrit name kamboji. Brihaddesi  authored by Sangit Acharya Matanga Muni  (500-700 AD) is the most important work between Natyashastra (2nd century BC) and Sangita Makarand (7th to 8th century AD). Sage Matanga probably hailed from south India. This Brihaddesi work is dated between 5th and 7th century AD but unfortunately it is incomplete. Portions of it appear to have lost down the road. Matanga's Brihaddeshi is the first major and available text to describe the Ragas as we understand them today.  Sangit Acharya Matanga informs us that "a classical melody (Raga) can not be composed of four notes or less. But the melodies used by the tribes such as the  Sabara, Pulinda, Kamboja, Vanga, Kirata, Vahlika, Andhra, Dravida and the Vanachra (forest dwelling) clans or tribes are an exception which contain four svaras or notes".

Classification according to gender
Sangita Makaranda also classifies the ragas according to their gender i.e. Male Ragas, Female Ragas (i.e., Raginis) and Neuter Ragas. According to Narada, the Male Ragas depict emotions of Raudra (anger), Veera (heroic) and Bhayanaka (fearful);  the Female Ragas represent sentiments of Shringara (romantic and erotic), Hasya (humorous) and Karuna (sorrow); while the Neuter Ragas represent emotions  of Vibhatsa (disgustful), Adbhuta (amazement) and Shanta (peaceful).

Each raga is principally dominated by one of these nine rasas or sentiments, although the performer can also bring out other emotions in a less prominent way. The more closely the notes of a raga conform to the expression of one single idea or emotion, the more overwhelming the effect of the raga.

Since the Raga Kambhoji has been classified as Female Raga (i.e., Ragini), this Raga is particularly suitable in conveying the sentiments of Shringara (romantic and erotic), Hasya (humorous) and Karuna (pathos).

Popular compositions 
There are many compositions set to Kambhoji rāgam, and it is one of the primary ragas in Carnatic music.

A few of these compositions are: (not an exhaustive list below)

Krishnamurthy kanna munde (8th Navaratna Malike), Kandu Kandu Nee Enna by Purandaradasa
Kailasavasa Gaurisha By Vijaya Dasa
Dasarendare Purandaradasarayya By Vyasatirtha
Emayya rama by Bhadrachala Ramadasu
Enna Vandaalum, Shivanai Ninaindu by Neelakanta Sivan
 Govinda Ghataya, Vedadri Sikhara, Sripatimiha by Narayana Teertha
 Lambodaram Avalambe, Mari mari vacchuna, Trivikramam Aham, Akhilanda Koti (Varnam) by Mysore Vasudevachar
 Kuzhaloodhi manamellam, Mithiladhipa, Aakka poruttavarkku, Vāngum enakku,  by Oothukkadu Venkata Kavi
Devi Ni Padasarasamule by Shyama Sastri
O Rangashayi, Maa Janaki, Elara Sri Krishna, Evari Mata, Mahita Pravrddha, Sri Raghuvara, Marimari Ninne, Margamu Telupave by Tyagaraja
 Kamalambikayai (4th Avarana), Sri Subrahmanyaya Namaste, Marakatavallim, Kailsanathena, Gopala Krishnaaya, Sri Valmika Lingam, Kashi Vishveshvara, Samba Sadashivaaya by Muthuswami Dikshitar
 Sarasijanabha (Varnam), Sarasa Mridupada (Varnam), Charupankaja, Inta Modiyaalara, Karanam Vina, Rasavilasa lolo, Namasudhamayi, Poorna Chandranana, Saradindu sama mukhanakum, Manasi Karuna, Padasanati Munijana, Panchabanan tannudaya (Padam), Innu Mama Bhagyataru (Padam, see Mohiniyattam) by Swathi Thirunal 
 Koniyadina Napai by Veena Kuppayyar
 Ratna Kanchuka Dharini, Shivam Harim by Harikesanallur Muthiah Bhagavatar 
 Adum Deivam, Anandame Paramanandame, Kaana kan kodi, Kadhirkama Kandan, Shikkal Meviya by Papanasam Sivan
 Thiruvadi Sharanam by Gopalakrishna Bharati
 En Kula Deivame by Ambujam Krishna
 Vennai Unnum En by Periyasami Thooran
 Ele Palimpa by M. Balamuralikrishna
 Natamadi Tirinda by Papavinasha Mudaliyar
 Ivan Yaaro Ariyen (Padam) by Kavi Kunjara Bharati
 Padari Varugudhu (Padam) by Subbarama Iyer
 Emi Mayamu (Javali) by Pattabhiramayya
 Pankajakshi (Varnam) by Maha Vaidyanatha Iyer
 Kamalakshi (Varnam) by Kunnakudi Krishnaiyer
 Taruni Ninnu (Varnam) by Fiddle Ponnuswami

Tamil Film song "Aadiya Paadhangal Ambalathil" song from the movie Oorukku Uzhaippavan composed by M. S. Viswanathan is set in Kambhoji Ragam.

References

External links

Majestic Kambhoji: 
Khambaj Raga: 
Commentary on Sri Subrahmanyaya Namaste: 
CAC Newsletter Notes on Yadukulakambhoji by Dr. V V Srivatsa: 
An Introduction To Indian Classical Music - Ancient History:

Further reading
Ragas and Raginis, O. P. Ganguli
Amīr Khusrau: Memorial Volume, 1975, p 35, Amīr Khusraw Dihlavī.
A Study of Dattilam: A Treatise on the Sacred Music of Ancient India, 1978, Mukunda Lāṭha, Dattila
Hindu Polity, Part I & II, 1978, Dr K. P. Jayswal
Invasion of Alexander, J. W. McCrindle
Indian Music: History and Structure, 1974, Emmie and Nijenhuis
Comparative Aesthetics, Eastern and Western, 1974, Gandur Hanumantha Rao
The Image of the Barbarian, Ancient Indian Social History: Some Interpretations, 2006
Image of the Barbarian in Early India, Comparative Study & History, Vol 13, No 4, Oct 1971, Dr Romila Thapar *Encyclopaedia of Indian Culture, 1984, p 1206, Rajaram Narayan Saletore;
Studies in Indian Music, 1962, p 168, Tirupasoor Venkata Subba Rao
Ragas and Raginis, pp 72–77, O. P. Ganguli;
The Language of the Gods in the World of Men; Sanskrit Culture, and Power in Pre-Mauryan India, Ch 8, p 299, Sheldon Pollock
The Historical Development of Indian Music: A Critical Study, 1973, Prajnanananda, Swāmī Prajñānānanda

Janya ragas